On 18 February 1991 two Provisional Irish Republican Army (IRA) bombs exploded at London mainline stations, one at Victoria station and the other at Paddington station, killing one person and injuring 38 other people at Victoria station. It was the IRA's second major attack in London in February 1991 after the Downing Street mortar attack eleven days earlier which was an attempt to assassinate the British War cabinet and the British prime minister John Major. It was also the first IRA attack against a civilian target in England since the 1983 Harrods bombing, marking a strategic change in their bombing campaign in England.

Background
The IRA had stepped up their campaign against British military, economic and transport targets outside of Northern Ireland in the late 1980s. On 30 July 1990 the IRA detonated a large bomb at the London Stock Exchange causing massive damage but no injuries. Ten days later they killed Conservative MP Ian Gow.

Previous bombings of the stations
On 26 February 1884, at Victoria station, an explosion occurred in the cloakroom of the Brighton side injuring seven staff members, as part of the Fenian dynamite campaign.

On 26 July 1939 bombs exploded in the cloakroom of Victoria stations. At Victoria, five people, cloakroom attendants and porters, were wounded and the station clock was shattered (see S-Plan). 

On 8 September 1973, an IRA bomb exploded at the ticket office in Victoria station, injuring five people.

The bombings
The Paddington bomb went off at 4:20am, it was much smaller than the second bomb at Victoria and was designed to make sure the security services would take the Victoria bomb seriously and not as a hoax. There were no deaths or injuries at Paddington but the roof was badly damaged.

Some time before 7:00 am, a caller with an Irish accent said: "We are the Irish Republican Army. Bombs to go off in all mainline stations in 45 minutes." The Victoria station bomb, which was hidden in a rubbish bin inside the station, went off at 7:40 am. Despite a 45-minute warning and the Paddington bomb three hours before, the security services were slow to act. The bomb killed one person instantly and injured 38 others from flying glass and other debris. This was the worst attack suffered by civilians in England by the IRA since the 1983 Harrods bombing which killed three policemen, three civilians and injured 50 people. All London's rail terminals were closed, disrupting the journeys of almost half a million commuters and bringing chaos to London, which was the IRA's intended goal. There was also a hoax call made to Heathrow, causing the airport's closure.

That night the IRA claimed responsibility for the bombings but blamed the British police for the casualties. A statement from the IRA GHQ said: "The cynical decision of senior security personnel not to evacuate railway stations named in secondary warnings, even three hours after the warning device had exploded at Paddington in the early hours of this morning was directly responsible for the casualties at Victoria." The statement went on, "All future warnings should be acted upon."

Police defended the decision not to close all stations after receiving warning that bombs had been planted. Commander George Churchill-Coleman, head of Scotland Yard's anti-terrorist squad, said that dozens of hoax calls were received every day. "It is very easy with hindsight to be critical." Churchill-Coleman also said that the bomb was "quite deliberately intended to maim and kill."

Aftermath
The Home Secretary, Kenneth Baker, visited Victoria station after the bomb and said "The concourse of Victoria is covered in blood. This is the act of murderous criminals." The Queen, and other officials, also sent their condolences to the victims.

This bombing would mark the IRA's shift to targeting civilian areas following the July 1990 London Stock Exchange bombing - something they had not done since the 1983 Harrods bombing. It was also the first IRA attack on the London transport system since 1976. The IRA kept bombing targets in England for the remainder of the year - dozens of bombs went off in the run up to Christmas 1991.

See also
Chronology of Provisional Irish Republican Army actions (1990–1991)
Bombings of King's Cross and Euston stations
Cannon Street train bombing
Parsons Green bombing

References

1991 in London
1991 murders in the United Kingdom
1990s in the City of Westminster
Attacks on railway stations in Europe
Attacks on buildings and structures in 1991
Attacks on buildings and structures in London
February 1991 crimes
February 1991 events in the United Kingdom
Improvised explosive device bombings in 1991
Bombings
Provisional IRA bombings in London
Terrorist incidents in London in the 1990s
Terrorist incidents in the United Kingdom in 1991
Terrorist incidents on railway systems in the United Kingdom
Unsolved murders in London
Victoria, London